Elizabeth Teft (fl. 1741—1747) was the author of a miscellany of occasional, topical, and political poetry. Although little is known of her life, her work has garnered scholarly interest.

Life
Not much is known about Teft other than what can be read or inferred from her writing. The editors of one modern anthology generally describe her as "an Anglican from the middling ranks." Various researchers have sought to identify her more specifically. There is a record of an Elizabeth Teft having been born in Rothwell, Lincolnshire in 1723, usually considered to be the writer, but that Elizabeth Teft seems to have died in infancy 1724. It is possible that Elizabeth Teft, the writer, was born subsequently to the parents of the deceased Elizabeth and given the same name, a not uncommon practice at that time of high infant mortality. Orlando identifies her father as one Joshua Teft; Roger Lonsdale identified a John Teft, cleric, as a probable relative.

Writing
The mystery surrounding Teft's life has not prevented readers from engaging with her work, then and now.  One commentator has written that her work "suggests considerable independence of mind." In "On Learning. Desired by a Gentleman," she criticizes the traditional education of girls and women:
Well, Ignorance, the cause is yet unknown
Why thou'rt confined unto my sex alone.
Why are not girls, as boys, sent forth when young
To learn the Latin, Greek, and Hebrew tongue? (ll. 1—4)

In other poems, Teft writes about friendship, politics, and popular literature: in "To the Unjust Author of Pamela in High Life," she rebukes Samuel Richardson for giving the heroine of his bestselling novel Pamela, or Virtue Rewarded the "harsh reward" (l. 22) of marriage to her adversary-turned-lover, Mr. B. Some poems are topical, such as "On hearing the Duke of Cumberland had defeated the Rebels." She often writes with humour, as when in "On Viewing Herself in a Glass," she asks "Was Nature angry when she formed my clay?/Or, urged by haste to finish, could not stay?" (ll. 1—2).

Teft's poems have been anthologized in Eighteenth-century women poets: an Oxford anthology (1989) and British women poets of the long eighteenth century (2009). A facsimile of Orinthia's Miscellanies was published in 2013.

Works
  "Orinthia's Request to the Gentlemen of Fortune," Gentleman's Magazine (1741)
 Orinthia's Miscellanies; or, A Compleat Collection of Poems, Never Before Published. By Elizabeth Teft of Lincoln (London, 1747)

Etexts 
 Orinthia's Miscellanies; or, A Compleat Collection of Poems, Never Before Published. By Elizabeth Teft of Lincoln (London, 1747) (Open Access at Google Books)

Notes

References
 Backscheider, Paula, and Catherine Ingrassia. "Elizabeth Teft." British women poets of the long eighteenth century: an anthology. Eds. Paula Backscheider and Catherine Ingrassia. Baltimore: Johns Hopkins University Press, 2009.
 Brown, Susan, et al. "Elizabeth Teft." Orlando: Women’s Writing in the British Isles from the Beginnings to the Present. Ed. Susan Brown, Patricia Clements, and Isobel Grundy. Cambridge University Press. Cambridge UP, n.d. 22 Mar. 2013. Accessed 5 Sept. 2022.
 Lonsdale, Roger. "Elizabeth Teft." Eighteenth-century women poets: an Oxford anthology. Ed. Roger Lonsdale, Oxford University Press, 1989, pp. 217–219. (Open access at Internet Archive.)
 "Teft, Elizabeth." The Women's Print History Project, 2019, Person ID 399. Accessed 2022-09-05.

External links
 

18th-century English people
18th-century English women
18th-century English poets
18th-century English writers
18th-century English women writers
18th-century pseudonymous writers
English women poets
People from Lincolnshire
Pseudonymous women writers
Writers from Lincolnshire
Writers of the Romantic era
Year of birth unknown
Year of death unknown